United Nations Security Council Resolution 1645, adopted unanimously on 20 December 2005, acting concurrently with the United Nations General Assembly, the council established the United Nations Peacebuilding Commission to advise on post-conflict situations, in accordance with the declaration of the 2005 World Summit.

Resolution

Observations
In the preamble of the resolution, the council reaffirmed the outcome of the 2005 World Summit and recognised that human rights, development, peace and security are mutually reinforcing and connected. There was a need for a co-ordinated, coherent and integrated approach to post-conflict peacebuilding and reconciliation, while the council also recognised the important role of the United Nations in the conflict prevention and efforts towards reconciliation.

The text reaffirmed the primary responsibility of national governments for determining post-conflict priorities and strategies, while the role of all countries, civil society, regional organisations and non-governmental organisations were important in peacebuilding.

Acts
In unison with the general assembly, the Peacebuilding Commission was established as an intergovernmental advisory body. The main goals of the commission were to bring together all stakeholders to advise and propose strategies for building peace and reconciliation after a conflict, to focus on the restoration of state institutions and make recommendations to improve co-ordination within and outside the United Nations.

The resolution then set out the composition of the commission, to include seven members of the security council, seven members of the United Nations Economic and Social Council, the top five providers to the United Nations budget, the top five providers to United Nations peacekeeping missions, with representation from all regional groups. It also discussed country-specific meetings of the commission, where representatives of the World Bank and International Monetary Fund, among others, could participate. The Peacebuilding Commission was encouraged to co-operate with international organisations as appropriate, and provide advice to the council in matter with which it is seized.

See also
 Conflict resolution
 List of United Nations Security Council Resolutions 1601 to 1700 (2005–2006)
 Peacekeeping
 Peacemaking

References

External links
 
Text of the Resolution at undocs.org

 1645
December 2005 events